The 2011–12 Borussia Dortmund season began on 23 July 2011 with a Revierderby loss against Schalke 04 in the DFL-Supercup. It ended with Dortmund completing the league and cup double with Bayern Munich as runners-up.

Transfers

Summer 2011

In:

Out:

Winter 2011–12

In:

Out:

Statistics

Goals and appearances

|-
|colspan="14"|Players sold or loaned out after the start of the season:

|}

Competitions

DFL-Supercup

Bundesliga

League table

Results summary

Results by matchday

Matches

DFB-Pokal

UEFA Champions League

Group stage

See also
2011 DFL-Supercup
2011–12 Bundesliga
2011–12 UEFA Champions League
2011–12 DFB-Pokal
Borussia Dortmund

References

Borussia Dortmund seasons
Borussia Dortmund
German football championship-winning seasons
Borussia Dortmund